Deriving from English 'band', Beni is a popular wedding entertainment with a strong focus on rhythm and dance, and audience participation. Commonly,  Zanzibar is recognized as place of origin around the turn of the 20th century as a mockery of colonial style military bands. 

Beni appropriated symbols of colonial authority as the military drill, uniform, and elaborate hierarchies.

History 

Beni has its origins in urban Swahili communities on the Kenyan coast in the 1890s. Around 1914, the style spread to Tanga and Dar es Sallam. During the First World War, beni was danced in both armies. First accounts of beni in Nyasaland were around 1918. Prisoners of war danced it in the detention camp at Zomba, followed by detachments of the 2nd KAR when they returned to Nairobi.

In 1921, beni was linked to those who served in the WWI. In the late colonial period, beni was a way for young people to express their independence.

In Zanzibar, Beni is performed both as a street parade and stationary as a wedding dance.

See also
Music of Tanzania

References

Culture of Zanzibar
Tanzanian music
Wedding music